Emoia schmidti, also known commonly as Schmidt's emo skink or Schmidt's skink, is a species of lizard in the family Scincidae. The species is endemic to the Solomon Islands.

Etymology
The specific name, schmidti, is in honor of American herpetologist Karl Patterson Schmidt.

Habitat

Description

Reproduction
E. schmidti is oviparous. Clutch size is two eggs.

References

Further reading
Adler GH, Austin CC, Dudley R (1995). "Dispersal and speciation of skinks among archipelagos in the tropical Pacific Ocean". Evolutionary Ecology 9: 529–541.
Brown WC (1954). "Notes on Several Lizards of the Genus Emoia with Descriptions of New Species from the Solomon Islands". Fieldiana Zoology 34 (25): 263–276. (Emoia schmidti, new species, pp. 270–273, Figure 45a).
Brown WC (1991). "Lizards of the Genus Emoia (Scincidae) with Observations on Their Evolution and Biogeography". Memoirs of the California Academy of Sciences (15): i-vi, 1-94. (Emoia schmidti, p. 73, Figure 29).
Klein ER, Harris RB, Fisher RN, Reeder TW (2016). "Biogeographical history and coalescent species delimitation of Pacific island skinks (Squamata: Scincidae: Emoia cyanura species group)". Journal of Biogeography 43 (10): 1917–1929.

Emoia
Reptiles of the Solomon Islands
Endemic fauna of the Solomon Islands
Reptiles described in 1954
Taxa named by Walter Creighton Brown